Madurai Airport  is an International airport serving Madurai and its adjoining districts in Tamil Nadu, India. It is the 36th busiest airport in India, both in terms of passengers handled and aircraft movement. It was established in 1957.

History 

Madurai airfield was first used by the Royal Air Force in World War II in 1942. The first passenger flight was a Fokker Friendship aircraft on the Madras – Madurai – Trivandrum – Madurai – Madras route in 1956.

It was identified as one of 35 non-metro airports for modernisation, and thus the new integrated terminal building was inaugurated on 12 September 2010.

The airport was notified as customs airport. The notification, issued on 31 December 2011, came into effect from 1 January 2012. Two chartered flights from Malaysia landed at the airport on 25 August 2012, making them the first international aircraft to land in the city. The first commercial international flight began on 20 September 2012 by SpiceJet commencing its maiden service to Colombo.

To boost exports from Madurai and its surrounding districts, the Department of Revenue under the Union Ministry of Finance issued a notification dated 28 May 2013 permitting the airport to handle cargo. The cargo terminal became operational from 15 December 2017.

Terminals 
The airport has two adjacent terminals, the old terminal and the new integrated terminal. Currently, the integrated terminal is used for both international and domestic purposes. The old terminal had been converted to a Cargo Terminal from 28 November 2017. Due to exponential growth of the airport in the recent years, building separate domestic and international terminals are in the plans.

Passenger Terminal 

As a part of modernising 35 non-metro airports, AAI constructed a new, state-of-the-art, integrated passenger terminal adjacent to the old terminal. The  new terminal building was inaugurated on 12 September 2010. This terminal with an area of  can handle a passenger capacity of 250 each on arrival and departure. The airport parking area has the capacity to park 375 cars and 10 buses. Some of the features of the new terminal include:
16 check-in counters
12 immigration counters
2 security counters
5 customs counters
3 conveyor belts ( each)
2 X-ray scanners for baggage
7 aircraft parking stand
3 Aero-bridges
 E-visa facility

The new terminal has two lounges: a VIP lounge managed by AAI and a Commercial Important Persons (CIP) lounge managed by Tamil Nadu Chamber of Commerce and Industry (TNCC-Madurai).

Cargo Terminal 
Considering the growing cargo potential in Madurai Airport, AAI has decided to alter the old terminal into a full-fledged cargo complex. To start with, the Union finance ministry issued customs notification dated 28 May 2013 to handle cargo at Madurai Airport. Works were going on a fast pace to start cargo lifting in the end of March 2014. A cold storage facility is being established for perishable cargo which is expected to dominate the export from this region. The International Cargo Terminal was inaugurated by Shri. Guruprasad Mohapatra I.A.S, Chairman of Airport Authority of India on 28 November 2017. International Cargo Service started on 15 December 2017 with 300 kg of Flowers including famous Madurai Malli (Jasmine). The first consignment was lifted by Spicejet to Dubai.

Runway 
ILS Cat-I is available for main runway 09/27.

Expansion 
The master plan includes a cargo complex along with two additional terminal buildings, expansion of runway and other facilities. The authority wants additional land for the same along with an air traffic control tower and other facilities to cater to the increasing passenger movement.

Airports Authority of India (AAI) is considering to provide a new terminal building for Madurai Airport in view of increased passenger traffic.

AAI Regional Executive Director said that performance of the airport on all fronts was good, especially the 35% growth in passenger movement reported in the last one year (2016-2017). The feasibility of expanding the terminal building is being studied. If that is not possible, new building will be constructed, which is already in the airport master plan.
The number of international passengers handled at the airport would decide on having a separate terminal or an integrated terminal. At present, the airport could handle 250 passengers each at arrival and departure halls. To cater the immediate requirement, 7 new aprons are being added to the airport.

AAI had asked around 610 acres of land in Madurai to take up runway extension work. The state government has promised that land will be acquired and handed over on time. In response to that, the district administration has proposed to acquire 610 acres to expand Madurai Airport. The proposed site, including 100 acres of poromboke (non-fertile) land, would pave way for extending the runway to 12,500 ft enabling the airport to handle overseas services.

A team comprising the Airports Authority of India, Highways Department, and Madurai Corporation officials had identified the site on the eastern side of the airport that would intersect the Ring Road over 5 km. As per the plan, the Ring Road would be disconnected at Mandela Junction and diverted via Perungudi and Avaniyapuram to connect the Tuticorin Road.

The AAI had also proposed to have a new technical building with a control tower. It had also planned to construct seven new aprons at Madurai Airport.

Statistics

Airlines and destinations

Incidents and accidents 
On 9 December 1971, an Avro-748 (VT-DXG Manufactured by Hindustan Aeronautics Ltd), operating Trivandrum - Madurai - Thiruchirapalli - Madras route, crashed in to Meghamalai Hills near Chinnamanur while descending into Madurai when it flew into high terrain about 50 mi (80 km) from the airport, killing all four crew members and 17 out of 27 passengers. The accident occurred in reduced visibility during daylight hours.

References

External links 

 

Airports in Tamil Nadu
Buildings and structures in Madurai
Transport in Madurai
1942 establishments in India